Sevastopol State University (formerly Sevastopol National Technical University (SevNTU), Sevastopol Instrument Engineering Institute (SIEI)) is a university in Sevastopol, Crimea.

History
Sevastopol Instrument Engineering Institute was founded in 1951 as a Sevastopol branch of Nikolayev Shipbuilding Institute (order of the Minister of Higher Education of the USSR No. 489 of 9 October 1951).

In June 1960, a Sevastopol branch of Odessa Polytechnic Institute (SB OPI) was created by Resolution of the Council of Ministers of the Ukrainian SSR No. 968 on the basis of the Sevastopol branch of NSI.

A significant event for Sevastopol and the recognition of the contribution of the research and educational staff became the opening at the end of 1963 by Resolution of the Council of Ministers of the USSR No. 1222 on the basis of SB OPI of Sevastopol Instrument Engineering Institute (SIEI) consisting of eight Departments: Instrument Engineering Techniques and Fine Mechanics; Radioelectronics; Mechanical Department; Construction Department; Extramural Department; General Technical Department; and two departments of Simferopol and Kerch branches.

Following the results of the state certification, in 1994 SIEI received the highest IV level of accreditation and was reorganized into Sevastopol State Technical University (Resolution of the Cabinet of Ministers of Ukraine No. 592 of 29 August 1994), and in 2001 by Decree of the President of Ukraine the university was granted the status of a national university. 
On the basis of the university the following institutions are actively operating: Institute of Modern Technologies and Innovations, SevNTU-FESTO, Delkam Training Center, Interdepartmental Laboratory of Biomechanics, Center for Training and Certification of Shipboard Personnel, Crimean Regional Center of Energy Management, a modern center of welding equipment, a driver training center, a number of training and personnel development courses (economics, computer science, management, etc.).

In October 2014 the university was reorganized as Sevastopol State University by Resolution of the Prime Minister of Russia.

Campuses and buildings
The campus includes a total of six (6) educational buildings, with an area of :

four (4) buildings are located on campus in Gagarinskiy district
the main building
the building of the Institute of modern technologies and innovations (SevNTU-FESTO)
the library
the sports center
two (2) buildings are located downtown on Gogolya Street

In addition, the campus also includes four (4) dormitories.

Institutes and faculties
On the basis of the university the following institutions are actively operating: Institute of Modern Technologies and Innovations SevNTU-FESTO, Delkam Training Center, Interdepartmental Laboratory of Biomechanics, Center for Training and Certification of Shipboard Personnel, Crimean Regional Center of Energy Management, a modern center of welding equipment, a driver training center, a number of training and personnel development courses (economics, computer science, management, etc.).

Six Departments

The Department of Economics and Management consists of five sub-departments: Finance and Credit; Accounting and Auditing; Business Economics; Economic Theory; Management, Economic and Mathematical Methods.
The Department of Technology and Automation of Machine and Instrument Engineering and Transport consists of seven sub-departments: Machine Engineering Technology; Automobile Transport; Automation of Technological Processes and Production; Automated Application Systems; Applied Ecology and Labor Protection; Technical Mechanics and Science of Machines.
The Department of Marine Technologies and Navigation consists of five sub-departments: Ocean Engineering and Shipbuilding; Navigation and Maritime Safety; Marine and Industrial Electromechanical Systems; Power Plants of Marine Ships and Structures; Descriptive Geometry and Graphics.
The Department of Automation and Computer Engineering consists of four sub-departments: Engineering Cybernetics; Cybernetics and Computer Science; Information Systems; and Higher Mathematics.
The Department of Radioelectronics consists of 3 sub-departments: Radio Engineering and Telecommunications; Electronic Engineering; and Physics.
The Department of Humanities consists of four sub-departments: Practice of Romano-Germanic Languages; Theory and Practice of Translation; Ukrainian Studies, Pedagogy and Culturology; Philosophical and Social Sciences.

As well as two sub-departments subordinated to the rector: Physical Education and Sport; Pre-Higher Education Training.

Honorable Doctors and famous alumni
Alexander Batalin
graduated from SIEI in 1969; on 24 August 2012 was awarded the title of the Hero of Ukraine

Yevgeniy Alisov
graduated from SIEI in 1967, Captain-Director of a large refrigerating fishing trawler “Zhukovskiy” of the Oceanic Fishery Administration, Crimea. By the Decree of the Presidium of the Supreme Council of the USSR of 13 April 1963 for exceptional success in attaining high figures in fishing and fish production Yevgeniy Alisov was awarded the title of the Hero of Socialist Labor and decorated with the Order of Lenin and a gold medal “Hammer and Sickle”.
He was awarded orders of Lenin, of Labor Red Banner, of the Great Patriotic War of the second degree, medals (including the medal “For Combat Services”).
Honorary Worker of the fishery of the USSR.
Honorary Citizen of Gagarinskiy District of the City of Sevastopol.

Viktor Yegorov
graduated from SIEI in 1967, Doctor of Biological Sciences (1988), Senior Staff Scientist (2000); Professor (2005), Corresponding Member of National Academy of Sciences of Ukraine (2006).
A member of the International Union of Radioecologists (1987), of Ukrainian Nuclear Society (1993), an academician of the Academy of Sciences of the Autonomous Republic of Crimea (1995), a State Prize winner in the field of science and technology (2007), an Honored Science and Technology Worker of the Autonomous Republic of Crimea (2011).
a Deputy Director for Science of the Institute of Biology of the Southern Seas – the IBSS (1989-1994); Head of the Department of Radiation and Chemical Biology (1994-2009); since 2010 – an acting Chief Research Officer of the Department of Radiation and Chemical Biology of the IBSS.

Alexey Veselkov
the Head of the Sub-department of Physics, Doctor of Engineering, Professor, Professor of the New-York Academy of Sciences. A small planet “Alex” is named after Alexey Veselkov.

Awards and reputation
Certificate of Honor of the Cabinet of Ministers of Ukraine No. 2501-26.01.01

Certificate of the International Academy Popularity and Quality Rating “Golden Fortune” 7–8.11.2002.

For significant contribution to cooperation and social partnership with the State Employment Center of Ukraine is awarded a badge of honor “For Cooperation” 02.12.2010.

Awarded a silver medal at the competition “Innovations used in information and communication technologies of the educational process» 18–20.11.2011.

 
Universities in Russia
National universities in Ukraine